Person is a surname. Notable people with the surname include:

Andrzej Person (born 1951), Polish senator
Chad Person (born 1978), American contemporary artist
Chuck Person (born 1964), National Basketball Association (NBA) assistant coach and former player
Curtis S. Person Jr. (1934–2020), American politician
Earl Old Person (born 1929), Native American (Blackfoot) politician
Houston Person (born 1934), American jazz saxophonist
Luis Sérgio Person (1936–1976), Brazilian filmmaker
Marina Person (born 1969), Brazilian actress, filmmaker and former MTV VJ
Mike Person (born 1988), former NFL Player
Robert Person (born 1969), former Major League Baseball pitcher
Ruth J. Person, first woman and seventh chancellor of the University of Michigan–Flint
Thomas Person (1733–1800), American politician
Waverly Person (1926-2022), American seismologist
Wesley Person (born 1971), former NBA player

See also
Persons (surname)
Persson
Willie Person Mangum (1792–1861), American politician